Saalekreis is a district in Saxony-Anhalt, Germany. The district seat is Merseburg. It is bounded by (from the west and clockwise) the districts Kyffhäuserkreis (Thuringia), Mansfeld-Südharz, Salzlandkreis, Anhalt-Bitterfeld, Nordsachsen, Leipzig (both Saxony) and Burgenlandkreis. The district-free city of Halle is surrounded by the Saalekreis.

History 
The district was established by merging the former districts of Merseburg-Querfurt and Saalkreis as part of the district reform of 2007.

Towns and municipalities 

The district Saalekreis consists of the following subdivisions:

References